Sean P. Stellato (born April 12, 1978) is an American sports agent, motivational speaker, and author.

Athletics

Stellato attended Salem High School where he played on the football and basketball teams helping lead the football team to the conference championship. He set numerous records as quarterback of the Witches. 

Stellato was a team captain and Agganis All-Star in 1996. Sean helped an undefeated (25-0) Salem High team win the State Basketball Championship in 1995.

At The Gunnery Prep school, he was M.V.P in football and basketball as well as being named All-New England in both sports.

As a Division I student-athlete at Marist College, Stellato was the leading receiver during the 2000 and 2001 seasons. He recorded the most receiving touchdowns in a career at the wide receiver position.

Football career

Stellato played two seasons in the AF2 (AF2), signing his first contract with the Florida Firecats in 2002. He also played with the Louisville Fire and the Memphis Xplorers. He went to Mini Camp with the New York Dragons. He became a member of the St. John's Prep football coaching staff in 2006.

Books

Stellato is the author of two books: 4th and Long The Odds: My Journey and No Backing Down which chronicle his journeys in life and sports. No Backing down is being converted to a screen play by Angelo Pizzo and was named Mascot Book of the year in 2014.  It was also featured in the Patriots Hall of Fame in 2015. He also wrote the kids books Football Magic: Buddy's New Beginning and Football Magic: A Pirate's Tale.

Philanthropy

Stellato ran and completed the 2007 and 2008 Boston Marathons. He raised $7,000 for the Respite Center and Good Sports.

Stellato volunteers at St. Judes Hospital and Shriners Hospital. He also supports Lifebridges Homeless Shelter, which is located in his hometown.

Honors and awards

In 2013, Stellato was inducted into the Massachusetts Italian American Sports Hall of Fame. That same year he was inducted into the Salem High School Hall of Fame and featured in Sports Networker "Top Agents in the NFL". In 2014, Stellato was honored with the Moynihan Lumber Post Graduate Achievement Award.
In 2016, Stellato was featured on the October cover of North Shore Magazine Movers and Shakers.

In August 2016, Stellato was selected as one of the Business Journal's 40-under-40.

In November 2017, Stellato was honored as Greater Boston's Ten Outstanding Young Leaders.

In June 2018, Stellato was inducted into the Gunnery Prep Athletic Hall of Fame.

References

1977 births
Living people
American sports agents
Marist Red Foxes football players
Florida Firecats players
Louisville Fire players
Memphis Xplorers players
New York Dragons players
Salem High School (Massachusetts) alumni